Alta Sherral "Allee" Willis (November 10, 1947 – December 24, 2019) was an American songwriter, multi-media artist, collector, and art director. Willis co-wrote hit songs including "September" and "Boogie Wonderland" by Earth, Wind & Fire. She also co-wrote the song "What Have I Done to Deserve This?", a number 2 hit in both the UK (in 1987) and U.S. (in 1988) for Pet Shop Boys featuring Dusty Springfield. She won two Grammy Awards for Beverly Hills Cop and The Color Purple, the latter of which was also nominated for a Tony Award, and was nominated for an  Emmy Award for "I'll Be There for You", which was used as the theme song for the sitcom Friends. Her compositions sold over 60 million records and she was inducted into the Songwriters Hall of Fame in 2018 as the only woman to be inducted that year.

Early life
Willis was born and grew up in Detroit, Michigan, where she attended Mumford High School. Her parents were Jewish. Her father, Nathan, was a scrapyard dealer. Her mother, Rose, an elementary school teacher, died suddenly while Willis was a teenager. Willis had a sister, Marlen Frost, and a brother, Kent Willis.

Willis's love of black music and culture developed early. As a teenager, Willis said she liked to hang out outside Motown Records to listen to the music coming through the walls. Although she loved her father, race was an issue that sometimes came between them. When she left for college, he wrote, "Stay away from Black culture." Her last words to him were, "I just got the gig to write The Color Purple."

She attended the University of Wisconsin-Madison and was a journalism major. She said she was a sorority member and later became an activist, "marching and demonstrating" during the 60s. After college, she moved to New York City in 1969 and worked as a secretary at Columbia Records as a copywriter, writing liner notes and advertising material, before turning to songwriting and performing.

Career
Her first and only album, Childstar, in 1974, did not sell well, and she stopped performing because she did not enjoy it. However, the album attracted the interest of Bonnie Raitt, who became the first musician to cover one of her songs. After moving to Los Angeles, she worked as a songwriter at A&M Records from 1977, and also wrote songs with, and for, Patti LaBelle and Herbie Hancock.

She worked at a comedy club and hung posters for four years. A mutual friend introduced her to Verdine White, and in turn to Maurice White of Earth, Wind & Fire. In the late 1970s she worked with Maurice White on the lyrics for her first big hit, "September", among other songs, and then co-wrote "Boogie Wonderland" with Jon Lind and "In the Stone" with Maurice White and David Foster.

Willis also wrote songs for artists including Debby Boone, Rita Coolidge, Crystal Gayle, Sister Sledge, Jennifer Holliday, Gladys Knight and the Pips, Cyndi Lauper, Crystal Waters, and Taylor Dayne. Songs she co-composed for other artists that became hits include "Lead Me On" by Maxine Nightingale, "Neutron Dance" by the Pointer Sisters, "What Have I Done to Deserve This?" by Pet Shop Boys featuring Dusty Springfield, and "I'll Be There for You" by The Rembrandts. "I'll Be There for You" was used as the theme song of the sitcom Friends and went on to become one of the biggest television theme songs yet. Willis jokingly referred to this song as "the whitest song I ever wrote". In 1995 Willis was Emmy-nominated for "I'll Be There for You".

In the 1980s, after starting to paint and make motorized sculptures, she became an art director for music videos, and worked on videos for such musicians as Debbie Harry and The Cars. In 1997, she addressed a U.S. House of Representatives subcommittee, to make the case for the property rights of BMI songwriters. She gave a keynote address at the first Digital World conference in 1992 and lectured on interactive journalism and on self-expression in cyberspace. She also co-wrote the Tony-nominated and Grammy-winning Broadway musical The Color Purple, first performed in 2005. , a major motion picture based on the musical was in the early stages of development, being produced by Steven Spielberg, Oprah Winfrey, Quincy Jones, and Scott Sanders.

Willis continued to work as an art director and set designer, and in 2008 won awards for her work with musician Holly Palmer on the music video artwork Allee Willis Presents Bubbles & Cheesecake. As an artist, she created paintings, ceramics and sculptures, and from 2009 she curated the Allee Willis Museum of Kitsch website. She launched a series of fundraising events in Detroit in 2010, with marching bands, in support of the city.

In 2015, Willis appeared as a kitsch expert on episodes of the A&E reality television show Storage Wars assisting Mary Padian.

On September 28, 2017, Willis premiered "The D", a passion project she wrote, recorded, and produced for her hometown of Detroit, at the Detroit Institute of Arts.

She was the only woman in the year 2018 to be inducted into the Songwriters Hall of Fame. Her compositions are reported to have sold over 60 million records.

Before her death in 2019, she made an appearance on the game show To Tell the Truth. The episode aired on June 18, 2020.

Personal life
Willis was noted for hosting spectacular parties at her home just outside Hollywood. She said: "I always had a music career, an art career, set designer, film and video, technology. The parties really became the only place I could combine everything."

From 1992 until her death, Willis was in a relationship with Prudence Fenton, an animator and producer.

Willis died in Los Angeles on December 24, 2019, at the age of 72. The cause of death was cardiac arrest.

Accolades

Grammy Awards
The Grammy Awards are awarded annually by the National Academy of Recording Arts and Sciences of the United States. Willis won two Grammys from three nominations.

|-
|1986
||"Beverly Hills Cop"
|Best Soundtrack Album Background Score from a Motion Picture or Television
|
|-
|2006
||"The Color Purple"
|Best Musical Show Album
|
|-
|2016
||"The Color Purple"
|Best Musical Theatre Album
|

Tony Awards
Willis was also nominated for a Tony Award.

Emmy Awards
Willis was also nominated for an Emmy Award.

References

External links

 
Allee Willis Interview NAMM Oral History Library (2018)

1947 births
2019 deaths
University of Wisconsin–Madison School of Journalism & Mass Communication alumni
Musicians from Detroit
Songwriters from Michigan
American women songwriters
Grammy Award winners
Jewish American songwriters
20th-century American composers
20th-century American women musicians
21st-century American composers
21st-century American women musicians
LGBT Jews
LGBT women
American LGBT musicians
LGBT people from Michigan
20th-century women composers
21st-century women composers
Mumford High School alumni
21st-century American Jews
21st-century American LGBT people